Ch'iyar Qullu (Aymara ch'iyara black, qullu mountain, "black mountain", also spelled Chiar Khollu) is a  mountain in the western extension of the Cordillera Real in the Andes of Bolivia. It is situated in the La Paz Department, Los Andes Province, Pucarani Municipality. Ch'iyar Qullu lies southwest of Tuni Lake, between the rivers Kunturiri in the north and Tuni in the south.

See also 
 Jach'a Jipiña
 Qullpani

References 

Mountains of La Paz Department (Bolivia)